Aging & Mental Health is a peer-reviewed monthly scientific journal published by Routledge covering research on the relationship between the aging process and mental health. The editors-in-chief are Martin Orrell, Rebecca Allen, and Terry Lum.

Abstracting and indexing 
The journal is abstracted and indexed in PubMed and Web of Science. According to the Journal Citation Reports, the journal has a 2020 impact factor of 3.658.

References

External links

See also
Mental health
Gerontology

English-language journals
Routledge academic journals
Gerontology journals